Quoit Green is an area of settlement in Derbyshire, England. It is located in Dronfield, close to the B6057 Chesterfield Road.

Villages in Derbyshire
North East Derbyshire District